Sente may refer to:

 Sente, a strategic concept in the game of Go
 Sente (software), academic reference manager for Mac OS X
 Sente Technologies, arcade game developer from the mid-1980s
 One-hundredth of the Lesotho loti